This is a list of Syracuse Orange football players in the NFL Draft.

Key

Selections

References

Syracuse

Syracuse Orange NFL Draft